Go Round Football Club is an association football club based in Omoku, Rivers State, Nigeria. They play their home games at Krisdera Hotel Stadium, and currently compete in the NNL, the second-tier in Nigerian football. The team is owned by Felix A. Obuah and coached by Ngozi Elechi. The team's general manager as of March 2016 is Soni Uboh.

History
They were promoted to the Nigeria Premier League for the first time in 2017 on the last day of the league season.

Federation Cup
Go Round secured qualification to the 2016 national Federation Cup on 3 April 2016. They defeated Rivers United F.C. 4–2 in a penalty shoot-out after a 1–1 draw in the final of the state competition.

The team was relegated in 2018/2019 season of the Nigerian Professional Football League to the Nigeria National League after it failed to secure several wins.

Current squad
As of January 2019

References

Football clubs in Nigeria